M5 highway may refer to:

 M5 highway (Russia)
 M5 highway (Belarus)
 M-5 highway (Montenegro)